A strategic grain reserve is a government stockpile of grain for the purpose of meeting future domestic or international needs. In the United States, such programs have included the Farmer-Owned Grain Reserve (1977–1996), Food Security Wheat Reserve (1980–1996), Food Security Commodity Reserve (1996–1998), and most recently the Bill Emerson Humanitarian Trust (1998–).

References 

Food politics
Strategic reserves of the United States
United States Department of Agriculture